John McMillan may refer to:

Politics
John McMillan (Alabama politician), American politician in Alabama
John McMillan (New Brunswick politician) (1816–1886), New Brunswick businessman and politician
John McMillan (Ontario politician) (1824–1901), Ontario farmer and politician
John McMillan (Prince Edward Island politician) (1851–1927), farmer and politician on Prince Edward Island
Alex McMillan (John Alexander McMillan III), U.S. congressman from North Carolina
John Angus McMillan (1874–1922), Ontario merchant and politician
John L. McMillan (1898–1979), U.S. congressman from South Carolina
John McMillan (public servant), Australian information commissioner and professor

Sports
Johnny McMillan (1871–1941), Scottish football player and manager
John D. McMillan (1919–1981), head football coach for the Citadel Bulldogs
John McMillan (Australian footballer) (1938–2017), Australian rules footballer for St Kilda
John MacMillan (rower) (1928–2006), British rower at the 1952 Summer Olympics – coxed four
John MacMillan (British Army officer) (born 1932), British general and rower at the 1952 Summer Olympics – double sculls
John McMillan (footballer, born 1937), Scottish footballer

Other
John McMillan (diplomat) (born 1914), Australian diplomat
John McMillan (economist) (1951–2007), professor of economics
John McMillan (missionary) (1752–1833), Presbyterian pastor and educator
John H. MacMillan (1895–1960), president of Cargill, 1936–60
John Mark McMillan (born 1979), American Christian musician
John Macmillan, British actor

See also
John M'Millan (c. 1669–1753) sometimes spelled McMillan or Macmillan, dissenter and founder of the Reformed Presbytery
John MacMillan (born 1935), Canadian ice hockey player
John Macmillan (1877–1956), bishop